Daymon Leasuasu (born in New Zealand on 20 January 1993) is a New Zealand rugby union player who plays for the  in Super Rugby. His playing position is lock. He was named in the Chiefs squad for week 3 in 2019.

Reference list

External links
itsrugby.co.uk profile

New Zealand rugby union players
Living people
Rugby union locks
1993 births
Counties Manukau rugby union players
Chiefs (rugby union) players
Black Rams Tokyo players
Rugby union players from Christchurch
Kurita Water Gush Akishima players